Maria Suppioti Ceroni (1730 – 1773?) was an Italian pastellist.

Born Maria Suppioti in Vicenza, Ceroni produced portraits and religious and mythological scenes and was active as an engraver as well. Her instructor was Giambettino Cignaroli. She was a member of the Verona Academy and was active in that city as well. She married one Ceroni in 1755.

References

1730 births
1770s deaths
Year of death uncertain
Painters from Vicenza
Painters from Verona
18th-century Italian painters
18th-century Italian women artists
Italian women painters
Pastel artists
Italian engravers
Women engravers
18th-century engravers